Ramlösa is a brand of carbonated mineral water from a source in Ramlösa Brunnspark in the southern part of Helsingborg, Sweden. Ramlösa goes back to the year 1707 when a mineral spa around the source was founded by Johan Jacob Döbelius.

Ramlösa is very common in northern Europe and is considered high-quality mineral water. Ramlösa is also popular outside Scandinavia and the water is exported as far as the United States, Middle East, Asia, Australia, and New Zealand.

Ramlösa is today a wholly owned subsidiary of the Danish brewery group Carlsberg.

Swedish commercials for Ramlösa previously had voice-overs by actor Stellan Skarsgård.

In popular culture

Books 
American Psycho, Patrick Bateman, the novel’s main character, rates Ramlösa as "very good".
The Girl Who Kicked the Hornet's Nest, the character Mikael Blomkvist requests the product as a favored drink.

Film 
Ocean's Eleven (2001) shows the beverage several times in its blue waterdrop export bottle.
The Player (1992), Tim Robbins's character declines a martini in favor of a glass of Ramlösa.

Music 
"Socker", a song by the Swedish band Kent, includes a biblical reference: "and Ramlösa becomes wine".

Television 
The Sopranos, season 2, episode 10, "Bust Out", mentions the beverage several times. Artie Bucco mentions he got “such a deal” on the Ramlösa.
Designing Women, season 6, episode 1, "The Big Desk, Part 1", the beverage is referenced by Julia Duffy's character, Allison Sugarbaker.

References

External links
 www.ramlosa.se

Swedish brands
Bottled water brands
Scania
Carbonated water
Purveyors to the Court of Sweden
Companies established in 1707
1707 establishments in Sweden
Companies based in Helsingborg
18th-century establishments in Skåne County